|}

The Champion Four Year Old Hurdle is a Grade 1 National Hunt hurdle race in Ireland which is open to horses aged four years. It is run at Punchestown over a distance of about 2 miles (3,219 metres), and during its running there are nine hurdles to be jumped. The race is for novice hurdlers, and it is scheduled to take place each year during the Punchestown Festival in late April or early May. The race is currently sponsored by the Ballymore Group

The field usually includes horses which ran previously in the Triumph Hurdle at Cheltenham, and the last to win both events was Vauban in 2022.

Records
Leading jockey since 1980 (5 wins):
 Ruby Walsh - Holy Orders (2001), Sporazene (2003), Diakali (2013), Abbyssial (2014), Bapaume (2017)

Leading trainer since 1980 (9 wins):
 Willie Mullins - Holy Order (2001), Quatre Heures (2006), Diakali (2013), Abbyssial (2014), Petite Parisienne (2015), Apple's Jade (2016), Bapaume (2017), Saldier (2018), Vauban (2022)

Winners since 1980

See also
 Horse racing in Ireland
 List of Irish National Hunt races

References
 Racing Post:

 pedigreequery.com – Punchestown Champion Four Year Old Hurdle – Punchestown.
 racenewsonline.co.uk – Racenews Archive (April 25, 2003).

National Hunt races in Ireland
National Hunt hurdle races
Punchestown Racecourse